This is an Index of Central America-related articles. This index defines Central America as the seven nations of Belize, Costa Rica, El Salvador, Guatemala, Honduras, Nicaragua, and Panama.

0–9
 .bz Internet country code top-level domain for Belize
 .cr Internet country code top-level domain for Costa Rica
 .gt Internet country code top-level domain for Guatemala
 .hn Internet country code top-level domain for Honduras
 .ni Internet country code top-level domain for Nicaragua
 .pa Internet country code top-level domain for Panama
 .sv Internet country code top-level domain for El Salvador
 1934 Central America hurricane
 1941 Atlantic hurricane season
 2001 El Salvador earthquakes

A
 Ages of consent in North America
 Americas (terminology)
 List of the busiest airports in Central America

B
 Vasco Núñez de Balboa
 Bay Islands Department
 Bay of San Miguel
 Belize
 List of Belize-related topics
 Belizean Kriol language
 Belizean people
 List of birds of Belize
 Endemic birds of Mexico and northern Central America
 List of birds of Costa Rica
 List of birds of El Salvador
 List of birds of Guatemala
 List of birds of Honduras
 List of birds of Nicaragua
 List of birds of Panama
 Boruca
 Boruca language
 Bribri
 Bribri language
 British Honduras 1862-1981
 Buddhism in Central America

C
 Canada Central American Free Trade Agreement
 Cantons of Costa Rica
 Captaincy General of Guatemala 1609-1821
 Caribbean Sea
 Central America
 Central America Volcanic Arc
 Central American and Caribbean Games
 1926 Central American and Caribbean Games
 1930 Central American and Caribbean Games
 1935 Central American and Caribbean Games
 1938 Central American and Caribbean Games
 1946 Central American and Caribbean Games
 1950 Central American and Caribbean Games
 1954 Central American and Caribbean Games
 1959 Central American and Caribbean Games
 1962 Central American and Caribbean Games
 1966 Central American and Caribbean Games
 1970 Central American and Caribbean Games
 1974 Central American and Caribbean Games
 1978 Central American and Caribbean Games
 1982 Central American and Caribbean Games
 1986 Central American and Caribbean Games
 1990 Central American and Caribbean Games
 1993 Central American and Caribbean Games
 1998 Central American and Caribbean Games
 2002 Central American and Caribbean Games
 2006 Central American and Caribbean Games
 Central American crisis
 Central American Defense Council
 Central American Football Union
 Central American Integration System
 Central American music
 Central American pine-oak forests
 Central American Seaway
 Central American Spanish
 Central American Unionist Party
 Central Highlands (Central America)
 Central Time Zone (Americas)
 CEPAL (United Nations Economic Commission for Latin America and the Caribbean)
 Chibchan languages
 Choco languages
 Chorotega
 Christopher Columbus (Cristoforo Colombo, Cristóbal Colón)
 Cinco de Mayo
 List of cities in Costa Rica
 List of cities in El Salvador
 List of places in Guatemala
 List of cities in Honduras
 List of cities in Panama
 Confederate settlements in British Honduras
 Congress of Guatemala
 Congress of Panama
 Conservation in Belize
 Constituencies of Belize
 Constitution of Belize
 Constitution of Guatemala
 Constitution of Nicaragua
 Contras
 Cordillera Central
 Cordillera de Talamanca
 Costa Rica
 Index of Costa Rica-related articles
 Costa Rican Civil War
 List of Conservation Areas of Costa Rica
 Costa Rican cuisine
 Culture of Costa Rica
 Cueva people
 Cuisine of Belize
 Culture of Belize
 Culture of El Salvador
 Culture of Guatemala
 Culture of Honduras
 Culture of Nicaragua
 Culture of Panama

D
 Darién Gap
 Darién Province
 Darien scheme
 Demographics of Belize
 Demographics of Costa Rica
 Demographics of El Salvador
 Demographics of Guatemala
 Demographics of Honduras
 Demographics of Nicaragua
 Demographics of Panama
 Departments of El Salvador
 Departments of Guatemala
 Departments of Honduras
 Departments of Nicaragua
 List of diplomatic missions of Belize
 List of diplomatic missions of Costa Rica
 List of diplomatic missions of El Salvador
 List of diplomatic missions of Guatemala
 List of diplomatic missions of Honduras
 List of diplomatic missions of Nicaragua
 List of diplomatic missions of Panama
 Districts of Belize
 Districts of Costa Rica
 Districts of Panama
 Dominican Republic – Central America Free Trade Agreement (DR-CAFTA)

E
 Eastern Time Zone
 Economy of Belize
 Economy of Costa Rica
 Economy of El Salvador
 Economy of Guatemala
 Economy of Honduras
 Economy of Nicaragua
 Economy of Panama
 Education in Belize
 Education in Costa Rica
 Education in El Salvador
 Education in Guatemala
 Education in Honduras
 Education in Nicaragua
 Education in Panama
 El Niño-Southern Oscillation
 El Salvador
 Index of El Salvador–related articles
 Salvadoran cuisine
 List of Salvadorans
 Elections in Belize
 Elections in Costa Rica
 Elections in El Salvador
 Elections in Guatemala
 Elections in Honduras
 Elections in Nicaragua
 Elections in Panama
 List of endemic species of Belize
 Ethnic groups in Central America
 Extreme points of Central America

F
 Fauna of Belize
 Federal Republic of Central America 1823-1838
 FIBA COCABA Championship
 Flora of Belize
 Football War
 Foreign relations of Belize
 Foreign relations of Costa Rica
 Foreign relations of El Salvador
 Foreign relations of Guatemala
 Foreign relations of Honduras
 Foreign relations of Nicaragua
 Foreign relations of Panama
 FSLN (Sandinista National Liberation Front)

G
 Garifuna people
 Garifuna language
 Geography of Belize
 Geography of Costa Rica
 Geography of El Salvador
 Geography of Guatemala
 Geography of Honduras
 Geography of Nicaragua
 Geography of Panama
 German colonization of the Americas
 Government of Nicaragua
 Gran Colombia (Republic of Colombia 1819-1831)
 Granadine Confederation 1858-1863
 Great Blue Hole
 Guatemala
 Index of Guatemala-related articles
 Guatemalan cuisine
 List of Guatemalans
 Guaymí
 Gulf of Darién
 Gulf of Fonseca
 Gulf of Honduras
 Gulf of Panama

H
 Hay–Bunau-Varilla Treaty of 1903
 Hispanic America
 History of Belize
 History of Central America
 History of Costa Rica
 History of El Salvador
 History of Guatemala
 History of Honduras
 History of Nicaragua
 History of Panama
 Honduras
 List of Honduras-related topics
 Honduran cuisine
 Hondurans
 List of Hondurans
 Hurricane Mitch 1998

I
 Indigenous languages of the Americas
 Indigenous peoples of the Americas
 International rankings of Costa Rica
 International rankings of Nicaragua
 Iran–Contra affair
 List of islands of Central America
 List of islands of Belize
 List of islands of Costa Rica
 List of islands of El Salvador
 List of islands of Guatemala
 List of islands of Honduras
 List of islands of Nicaragua
 List of islands of Panama
 ISO 3166-2:BZ code for Belize
 ISO 3166-2:CR code for Costa Rica
 ISO 3166-2:GT code for Guatemala
 ISO 3166-2:HN code for Honduras
 ISO 3166-2:NI code for Nicaragua
 ISO 3166-2:PA code for Panama
 ISO 3166-2:SV code for El Salvador
 Isthmus of Panama

J

K
 Kuna language
 Kuna (people)

L
 Lake Managua
 Lake Nicaragua
 Land mines in Central America
 List of endangered languages in Central America
 Languages of Belize
 Languages of Costa Rica
 Languages of Nicaragua
 Latin America
 Latin America – United States relations
 Latin American cuisine
 Lenca language
 Lenca people
 Liberalism in Honduras
 Liberalism in Nicaragua
 Liberalism in Panama

M
 Macro-Chibchan languages
 Maleku people
 Maléku language
 Mallarino–Bidlack Treaty of 1846
 List of mammals of Central America
 Maya civilization
 Maya peoples
 Maya ruins of Belize
 Maya script
 Mayan languages
 Mayan sign languages
 Mesoamerica
 Mesoamerican Barrier Reef System
 Mesoamerican Biological Corridor
 Mesoamerican Linguistic Area
 Mesoamerican literature
 Mesoamerican region
 Mestizo
 Middle America (Americas)
 Military of Belize
 Military of Costa Rica
 Armed Forces of El Salvador
 Military of Guatemala
 Military of Honduras
 Military of Nicaragua
 Military of Panama
 Miskito people
 Miskito Coastal Creole
 Miskito language
 Mopan language
 Mopan people
 Mosquito Coast (Miskito Coast)
 Mountain peaks of Central America
 List of Ultras in Central America
 Municipalities of El Salvador
 Municipalities of Guatemala
 Municipalities of Honduras
 Municipalities of Nicaragua
 List of museums in Costa Rica
 List of museums in Nicaragua
 Central American music
 Music of Belize
 Music of Costa Rica
 Music of El Salvador
 Music of Guatemala
 Music of Honduras
 Music of Nicaragua
 Music of Panama

N
 Naso people
 National Assembly of Belize
 National Assembly of Nicaragua
 National Assembly of Panama
 National Congress of Honduras
 National symbols of Nicaragua
 Nicaragua
 Index of Nicaragua-related articles
 Nicaraguan cuisine
 Nicaraguans
 List of Nicaraguans
 Nicaragua Canal
 Nicaragua v. United States
 Nicaraguan Revolution
 North America

O
 Oto-Manguean languages

P
 Pacific Ocean
 Pan-American Highway
 Panama
 Index of Panama-related articles
 Panamanian cuisine
 List of Panamanians
 Panama Canal
 History of the Panama Canal
 Panama Canal Zone 1903-1979
 Panama Railway
 Panama - United States Trade Promotion Agreement of 2007
 Pipil people
 Pipil language
 Political history of Nicaragua
 List of political parties in Central America by country
 List of political parties in Belize
 List of political parties in Costa Rica
 List of political parties in El Salvador
 List of political parties in Guatemala
 List of political parties in Honduras
 List of political parties in Nicaragua
 List of political parties in Panama
 Politics of Belize
 Politics of Costa Rica
 Politics of El Salvador
 Politics of Guatemala
 Politics of Honduras
 Politics of Nicaragua
 Politics of Panama
 Portal:Belize
 Portal:Costa Rica
 Portal:El Salvador
 Portal:Guatemala
 Portal:Nicaragua
 Portal:Panama
 List of prime ministers of Belize
 List of presidents of Costa Rica
 President of El Salvador
 President of Guatemala
 President of Honduras
 List of presidents of Honduras
 President of Nicaragua
 List of heads of state of Panama
 Protected areas of Nicaragua
 Proto-Mayan extinct language
 Provinces and regions of Panama
 Provinces of Costa Rica

Q
 Q'eqchi' language
 Q'eqchi' people

R
 Rail transport in Central America
 Rama language
 Rama people
 Religion in Belize
 Religion in Costa Rica
 Religion in El Salvador
 Religion in Guatemala
 Religion in Honduras
 Religion in Nicaragua
 Religion in Panama
 Republic of Central America 1896-1898
 Republic of New Granada 1831-1858
 List of rivers of Belize
 List of rivers of Honduras

S
 Salvadoran Civil War
 Sandinista National Liberation Front (FSLN)
 List of schools in Honduras
 List of schools in Nicaragua
 South America
 Sport in Belize
 Sport in Honduras

T
 Telecommunications in Belize
 Telecommunications in Costa Rica
 Telecommunications in El Salvador
 Telecommunications in Guatemala
 Telecommunications in Honduras
 Telecommunications in Nicaragua
 Telecommunications in Panama
 Teribe language
 Torrijos–Carter Treaties of 1977
 Tourism in Belize
 Tourism in Costa Rica
 Tourism in Nicaragua
 List of town tramway systems in Central America
 Transport in Belize
 Transport in El Salvador
 Transport in Guatemala
 Transport in Honduras
 Transport in Nicaragua
 Transport in Panama
 Transport in Costa Rica

U
 United Nations Economic Commission for Latin America and the Caribbean (CEPAL)
 United States invasion of Panama 1989
 United States occupation of Nicaragua 1912-1933
 United States of Colombia 1863-1886
 List of universities in Belize
 List of universities in Costa Rica
 List of universities in El Salvador
 List of universities in Guatemala
 List of universities in Honduras
 List of universities in Nicaragua
 List of universities in Panama

V
 Viceroyalty of New Granada 1717-1819
 Viceroyalty of New Spain 1535-1821
 List of volcanoes in Costa Rica
 List of volcanoes in El Salvador
 List of volcanoes in Guatemala
 List of volcanoes in Honduras
 List of volcanoes in Nicaragua
 List of volcanoes in Panama

W
 :Category:Waterfalls of Costa Rica
 Wildlife of Costa Rica
 Wildlife of Nicaragua
 List of Central American writers

X
 Xinca language
 Xinca people

Y
 Yucatán Peninsula
 Yucatec Maya language

Z

See also

 Anglo-America
 List of Caribbean-related topics
 Lists of country-related topics
 Index of Belize-related articles
 Index of Costa Rica-related articles
 Index of El Salvador–related articles
 Index of Guatemala-related articles
 Index of Honduras-related articles
 Index of Nicaragua-related articles
 Index of Panama-related articles
 Outline of North America
 Outline of South America

Index
Central America